Gabriella Paruzzi (born 21 June 1969 in Udine) is a retired Italian cross-country skier who competed from 1991 to 2006 and formerly skied with the G.S. Forestale. She skied in World Cup events, and won the Women's Overall World Cup in 2004.

Equipment
She was sponsored by Rossignol, and skied with Rossignol X-IUM skis for both skate and classic disciplines. Her boots were also named Rossignol X-IUM's, and the bindings are Rottefella R3's. Her boots and bindings are of the New Nordic Norm (NNN) system.

2002 Winter Olympics
At the 2002 Olympics, she was in the women's 30 km classical event, when one of her poles broke. Luckily, her coach was nearby, and she took his pole, which was too long. She kept on racing and near the end the coach came back to give her the right size pole. She caught the pack of skiers and ended up winning gold by 4.5 seconds in that race.

Cross-country skiing results
All results are sourced from the International Ski Federation (FIS).

Olympic Games
 5 medals – (1 gold, 4 bronze)

World Championships
 5 medals – (3 silver, 2 bronze)

a.  Cancelled due to extremely cold weather.

World Cup

Season standings

Individual podiums
4 victories 
18 podiums

Team podiums

 3 victories – (2 , 1 ) 
 29 podiums – (25 , 4 ) 

{| class="wikitable sortable" style="font-size:95%; text-align:center; border:grey solid 1px; border-collapse:collapse; background:#ffffff;"
|- style="background:#efefef;"
! style="background-color:#369; color:white;"| No.
! style="background-color:#369; color:white;"| Season
! style="background-color:#4180be; color:white; width:120px;"| Date
! style="background-color:#4180be; color:white; width:195px;"| Location
! style="background-color:#4180be; color:white; width:170px;"| Race! style="background-color:#4180be; color:white; width:130px;"| Level
! style="background-color:#4180be; color:white;| Place
! style="background-color:#4180be; color:white;"| Teammate(s)
|-
| align=center|1 || rowspan=1 align=center| 1990–91 || align=right| 15 February 1991 || align=left|   Val di Fiemme, Italy || 4 × 5 km Relay C/F || World Championships || 2nd || Vanzetta / Di Centa / Belmondo
|-
| align=center|2 || rowspan=1 align=center| 1991–92 || align=right| 18 February 1992 || align=left|   Albertville, France || 4 × 5 km Relay C/F || Olympic Games || 3rd || Vanzetta / Di Centa / Belmondo
|-
| align=center|3 || rowspan=1 align=center| 1992–93 || align=right| 26 February 1993 || align=left|   Falun, Sweden || 4 × 5 km Relay C/F || World Championships || 2nd || Vanzetta / Di Centa / Belmondo
|-
| align=center|4 || rowspan=1 align=center| 1993–94 || align=right| 22 February 1994 || align=left|   Lillehammer, Norway || 4 × 5 km Relay C/F || Olympic Games || 3rd || Vanzetta / Di Centa / Belmondo
|-
| align=center|5 || rowspan=2 align=center| 1995–96 || align=right| 17 December 1995 || align=left|   Santa Caterina, Italy || 4 × 5 km Relay C || World Cup || 2nd || Paluselli / Belmondo / Di Centa
|-
| align=center|6|| align=right| 14 January 1996 || align=left|  Nové Město, Czech Republic || 4 × 5 km Relay C ||World Cup || 3rd || Paluselli / Belmondo / Di Centa
|-
| align=center|7 || rowspan=2 align=center| 1996–97 || align=right| 15 December 1996 || align=left|   Brusson, Italy || 4 × 5 km Relay F || World Cup || 3rd || S. Valbusa / Dal Sasso / Belmondo
|-
| align=center|8|| align=right| 16 March 1997 || align=left|  Oslo, Norway || 4 × 5 km Relay F ||World Cup || 3rd || Peyrot / S. Valbusa / Belmondo
|-
| align=center|9|| rowspan=3 align=center| 1997–98 || align=right| 23 November 1997 || align=left|   Beitostølen, Norway || 4 × 5 km Relay C || World Cup || 3rd || Moroder / S. Valbusa / Belmondo
|-
| align=center|10|| align=right| 7 December 1997 || align=left|  Santa Caterina, Italy || 4 × 5 km Relay F ||World Cup || 3rd || Moroder / S. Valbusa / Belmondo
|-
| align=center|11|| align=right| 14 December 1997 || align=left|  Val di Fiemme, Italy || 4 × 5 km Relay F ||World Cup || 2nd || Di Centa / S. Valbusa / Belmondo
|-
| align=center|12|| rowspan=5 align=center| 1998–99 || align=right| 29 November 1998 || align=left|   Muonio, Finland || 4 × 5 km Relay F || World Cup || 2nd || Moroder / S. Valbusa / Belmondo 
|-
| align=center|13|| align=right| 20 December 1998 || align=left|  Davos, Switzerland || 4 × 5 km Relay C/F ||World Cup || 2nd || Confortola / Belmondo / S. Valbusa
|-
| align=center|14|| align=right| 10 January 1999 || align=left|  Nové Město, Czech Republic || 4 × 5 km Relay C/F ||World Cup || 3rd || Confortola / Belmondo / S. Valbusa
|-
| align=center|15|| align=right| 26 February 1999 || align=left|  Ramsau, Austria || 4 × 5 km Relay C/F ||World Championships || 2nd || S. Valbusa / Confortola / Belmondo 
|-
| align=center|16|| align=right| 14 March 1999 || align=left|  Falun, Sweden || 4 × 5 km Relay C/F ||World Cup || 3rd ||  S. Valbusa / Confortola / Belmondo 
|-
| align=center|17|| rowspan=2 align=center| 1999–00 || align=right| 27 February 2000 || align=left|   Falun, Sweden || 4 × 5 km Relay F || World Cup || 3rd || S. Valbusa / Confortola / Belmondo
|-
| align=center|18|| align=right| 4 March 2000 || align=left|  Lahti, Finland || 4 × 5 km Relay C/F ||World Cup || 3rd || Santer / Confortola / S. Valbusa
|-
| align=center|19||rowspan=1 align=center|2000–01|| bgcolor="#BOEOE6" align=right| 13 January 2001 || align=left|  Soldier Hollow, United States  || bgcolor="#BOEOE6"|  4 × 5 km Relay C/F || bgcolor="#BOEOE6"|World Cup || bgcolor="#BOEOE6"|1st|| S. Valbusa / Paluselli / Belmondo
|-
| align=center|20 || rowspan=4 align=center| 2001–02 || align=right| 16 December 2001 || align=left|  Davos, Switzerland ||4 × 5 km Relay C/F|| World Cup || 3rd ||  Paluselli / Follis / Belmondo
|-
| align=center|21|| align=right| 13 January 2002 || align=left|  Nové Město, Czech Republic || 4 × 1.5 km Team Sprint F ||World Cup || 2nd ||  S. Valbusa
|-
| align=center|22|| bgcolor="#BOEOE6" align=right| 3 March 2002 || align=left|  Lahti, Finland || bgcolor="#BOEOE6"| 4 × 1.5 km Team Sprint F|| bgcolor="#BOEOE6"|World Cup || bgcolor="#BOEOE6"|1st || S. Valbusa
|-
| align=center|23|| bgcolor="#BOEOE6" align=right| 10 March 2002 || align=left|  Falun, Sweden || bgcolor="#BOEOE6" |4 × 5 km Relay C/F || bgcolor="#BOEOE6"|World Cup || bgcolor="#BOEOE6"|1st || S. Valbusa / Paluselli / Belmondo
|-
| align=center|24|| rowspan=3 align=center| 2002–03 || align=right| 24 November 2002 || align=left|   Kiruna, Sweden ||4 × 5 km Relay C/F || World Cup || 3rd || Genuin / Follis / S. Valbusa
|-
| align=center|25|| align=right| 1 December 2002 || align=left|  Rukatunturi, Finland || 2 × 5 km / 2 × 10 km Relay C/F ||World Cup || 3rd || F. Valbusa / S. Valbusa / Piller Cottrer
|-
| align=center|26|| align=right| 23 March 2003 || align=left|  Falun, Sweden || 4 × 5 km Relay C/F ||World Cup || 3rd || S. Valbusa / Confortola / Follis
|-
| align=center|27|| rowspan=1 align=center| 2003–04 || align=right| 7 February 2004 || align=left|   La Clusaz, France || 4 × 5 km Relay C/F || World Cup || 3rd || Longa / Confortola / S. Valbusa
|-
| align=center|28 || rowspan=2 align=center| 2004–05 || align=right| 24 November 2004 || align=left|  Düsseldorf, Germany || 6 × 0.8 km Team Sprint F|| World Cup || 3rd || Follis
|-
| align=center|29 || align=right| 5 December 2004 || align=left|  Bern, Switzerland  || 6 × 1.1 km Team Sprint F ||World Cup || 3rd || Follis
|}Note:'''  Until the 1999 World Championships and the 1994 Olympics, World Championship and Olympic races were included in the World Cup scoring system.

Trivia
 The ski stadium in Tarvisio is named in her honor.

Notes

External links
 
  

Italian female cross-country skiers
Cross-country skiers at the 1992 Winter Olympics
Cross-country skiers at the 1994 Winter Olympics
Cross-country skiers at the 1998 Winter Olympics
Cross-country skiers at the 2002 Winter Olympics
Cross-country skiers at the 2006 Winter Olympics
1969 births
Living people
Olympic cross-country skiers of Italy
Olympic gold medalists for Italy
Olympic bronze medalists for Italy
Olympic medalists in cross-country skiing
Sportspeople from Udine
FIS Nordic World Ski Championships medalists in cross-country skiing
FIS Cross-Country World Cup champions
Medalists at the 2006 Winter Olympics
Medalists at the 2002 Winter Olympics
Medalists at the 1998 Winter Olympics
Medalists at the 1994 Winter Olympics
Medalists at the 1992 Winter Olympics